This page consists of a list of wastewater treatment technologies:

See also

Agricultural wastewater treatment
Industrial wastewater treatment
List of solid waste treatment technologies
Waste treatment technologies
Water purification
Sewage sludge treatment

References

 
 
 Industrial Wastewater Treatment Technology Database EPA. 

Chemical processes
Environmental engineering
List
Water pollution
Water technology
Waste-water treatment technologies
Sanitation